Group C of the 2010 FIFA World Cup began on 12 June and ended on 23 June 2010. The group consisted of England, the United States, Algeria and Slovenia. Only England and the United States had previously met at a World Cup in 1950, when the United States defeated England 1–0.

The United States and England finished tied at the top of the group with five points each, with their goal differences also level at +1. However, the United States won the group, having scored more goals than England in their three games.

Standings

The United States advanced to play Ghana (runners-up of Group D) in the round of 16.
England advanced to play Germany (winners of Group D) in the round of 16.

Matches
All times local (UTC+2)

England vs United States
England controlled the early part of the match and got off to a quick lead when an unmarked Steven Gerrard made a run into the box and beat United States goalkeeper Tim Howard in the fourth minute with the outside of his right foot. The United States equalised in the 40th minute when a seemingly harmless shot by Clint Dempsey was mishandled by England goalkeeper Robert Green and rolled into the net. The United States had a good opportunity to take the lead and pull off a surprise upset in the second half; striker Jozy Altidore muscled his way through the left side of the English defence and had a good attempt on goal, but Green deflected the shot against the crossbar. England also had a good opportunity to win the game when Emile Heskey fired straight at the goalkeeper in a one-on-one situation.

Algeria vs Slovenia

Slovenia vs United States
Once again the U.S. was outplayed early, as Valter Birsa netted for Slovenia from distance and Zlatan Ljubijankić extended the lead soon after to give them a 2–0 lead at half-time. In the 48th minute, Landon Donovan cut the lead in half for the United States when he dribbled into the Slovenian box and blasted a close-range shot over Samir Handanović into the roof of the net. The United States kept their hopes of advancement alive when they equalised in the 82nd minute. Altidore placed a header into the Slovenian box that was run down by midfielder Michael Bradley, who lobbed the keeper to tie the game. A few minutes later, the United States looked as if they were going to complete their comeback when a Donovan free kick was volleyed in by substitute Maurice Edu; however, referee Koman Coulibaly disallowed the goal and the game ended in a 2–2 draw.

England vs Algeria

Slovenia vs England
Jermain Defoe's 23rd-minute goal allowed England to claim the win and progress to the knockout stage of the competition. After the goal, England created several more chances but were unable to add to their lead.

United States vs Algeria
Early in the game, the United States nearly allowed another early goal as an Algerian shot hit the crossbar. Throughout the remainder of the game, the United States had a number of good chances against a solid Algerian defence that allowed just one goal from two games; striker Jozy Altidore volleyed wide of an open net, while Clint Dempsey had a goal disallowed for a controversial offside call and later hit the crossbar on a shot and missed an empty net on the rebound. After 90 minutes of a scoreless affair, the United States were at risk of elimination: with England leading Slovenia 1–0, a 0–0 draw for the United States would have caused them to finish third in Group C on three points (behind England on five and Slovenia on four). However, in stoppage time, American goalkeeper Tim Howard quickly threw an outlet pass to Landon Donovan, who moved the ball up the pitch and passed the ball just outside the box to Altidore, who then crossed the ball to an open Dempsey in the middle of the box. With the Algerian goalkeeper closing in, Dempsey shot quickly and was blocked; however, Donovan followed the shot and put the rebound into the net for an easy goal. The United States held on for the final few minutes for a 1–0 victory. The late goal not only saved the United States from elimination but also allowed them to win their group for the first time since 1930, advancing to play Ghana in the round of 16.

References

Group C
Group
Group
Slovenia at the 2010 FIFA World Cup
Algeria at the 2010 FIFA World Cup